The 1987–1988 season was the 109th season in Bolton Wanderers F.C.'s existence, and their first season in the Fourth Division following relegation from the Third Division. Until the 2020-21 season, it was the only season that the club had spent in the bottom tier of English football.

This article covers the period from 1 July 1987 to 30 June 1988.

Kit
Bolton retained the previous season's kit, manufactured by Umbro and sponsored by Normid.

Results

Division Four

FA Cup

Littlewoods Cup

Associate Members Cup

Top scorers

References

Bolton Wanderers
Bolton Wanderers F.C. seasons